The Episcopal Diocese of Upper South Carolina (EDUSC) is a diocese in the Episcopal Church.

Originally part of the Diocese of South Carolina, it became independent on October 10–11, 1922 following nearly two years of planning. The see city is Columbia. Its cathedral is Trinity Cathedral. The diocese comprises approximately 60 congregations in the Upstate (northwestern) and Midlands regions of the U.S. state of South Carolina. There are five convocations in the diocese: Midlands (Columbia area), Catawba (Rock Hill area), Foothills (Greenville area), Gravatt (Aiken area), and Piedmont (Spartanburg areas).

The bishop is Daniel P. Richards. He was elected bishop on September 25 2021 and was consecrated at Trinity Cathedral as bishop on February 26 2022.

Among the Diocese's many institutions, the Bishop Gravatt Center began service in 1949 as a retreat and summer camp site. Now a non-profit corporation with its own Board of Trustees, the Center remains a vital part of the Diocese through its summer camp Christian formation program and numerous diocesan and parish activities such as Happening, Cursillo, youth retreats, vestry retreats, parish family weekends, etc.

Bishops of Upper South Carolina

Parishes, Missions and Institutions as of August 2015

Parishes and Missions
Abbeville - Trinity Church 
Aiken - Saint Augustine of Canterbury Church
Aiken - Saint Thaddeus Church  
Anderson - Grace Church  
Anderson - Saint George's Church  
Beech Island - All Saints' Church
Batesburg - Saint Paul's Church  
Boiling Springs - Saint Margaret's Church  
Camden - Grace Church  
Cayce - All Saints' Church  
Chapin - Saint Francis of Assisi Church  
Chester - Saint Mark's Church  
Clemson - Holy Trinity Church  
Clinton - All Saints' Church
Columbia - Church of the Good Shepherd
Columbia - St Lukes Church
Columbia - St Davids Church
Columbia - Trinity Cathedral Church  
Columbia - Church of the Cross
Columbia - St Timothys Church
Columbia - St Johns Church
Columbia - St Marys Church
Columbia - St Martins in the Fields Church  
Columbia - St Michael & All Angels Church  
Easley - St Michaels Church 
Eastover - St Thomas  
Edgefield - Church of the Ridge  
Fort Mill - St Pauls Episcopal Church  
Gaffney - Church of the Incarnation  
Graniteville - Saint Paul's Church  
Great Falls - Saint Peter's Church
Greenville - Saint Francis' Church 
Greenville - Christ Church    
Greenville - Saint Philip's Church  
Greenville - Saint Peter's Church
Greenville - Church of the Redeemer  
Greenville - Saint Andrew's Church  
Greenville - Saint James Church  
Greenwood - Church of the Resurrection  
Greer - Church of the Good Shepherd
Hopkins - Saint John's Church  
Irmo - Church of Saint Simon and Saint Jude  
Jenkinsville - Saint Barnabas' Church 
Lancaster - Christ Church  
Laurens - Church of the Epiphany  
Lexington - Saint Alban's Church  
Newberry - Saint Luke's Church
North Augusta - Saint Bartholomew's Church       
Ridgeway - Saint Stephen's Church  
Rock Hill - Church of Our Saviour  
Seneca - Church of the Ascension  
Simpsonville - Holy Cross Church  
Spartanburg - Saint Christopher's Church  
Spartanburg - Saint Matthew's Church  
Spartanburg - Church of the Advent
Spartanburg - Church of the Epiphany
Trenton - Church of the Ridge   
Union - Church of the Nativity   
Winnsboro - Saint John's Church
York - Church of the Good Shepherd

Institutions
Aiken  Bishop Gravatt Center / Camp Gravatt  
Aiken  Mead Hall School
Columbia  George M. Alexander Diocesan House
Columbia  Finlay House
Columbia  Heathwood Hall Episcopal School  
Columbia  Saint Lawrence Place  
Denmark  Voorhees College,   
Greenville  Christ Church Episcopal School
West Columbia  Chapel of the Holy Spirit (at Still Hopes)  
West Columbia  South Carolina Episcopal Home at Still Hopes  
York  York Place

References

See also The Episcopal Church Annual. Morehouse: New York, NY, 2009 and the online interactive directory at The Red Book

External links
The Episcopal Diocese of Upper South Carolina.
The Bishop Gravatt Center.
Trinity Episcopal Church - Columbia, S.C. photos and history

Upper South Carolina, Episcopal Diocese of
Diocese of Upper South Carolina
Christian organizations established in 1922
Province 4 of the Episcopal Church (United States)